is a Japanese actress, voice actress and singer from Tokyo, Japan. She was affiliated with Arts Vision but has since founded her own voice company called Banbina. When she was a high school student, she was an assistant of Jump Broadcasting Station of Weekly Shōnen Jump (1988–1996). Some of her major roles are Sasami Masaki Jurai (Tenchi Muyo!), Ryoko Subaru (Martian Successor Nadesico), Lucrezia Noin (Mobile Suit Gundam Wing) and Sakura Shinguji (Sakura Wars). She married musician Chaka from the band Tripolysm and their first child was born in September 2015.

Filmography

Animation

Video games

Audio dramas

Dubbing
Clueless, Cher Horowitz (Alicia Silverstone)
Fly Away Home, Amy Alden (Anna Paquin)

References

External links
 Chisa Club - Chisa Yokoyama's Official Fanclub site 
 

1969 births
Living people
Arts Vision voice actors
Japanese musical theatre actresses
Japanese women pop singers
Japanese stage actresses
Japanese video game actresses
Japanese voice actresses
Voice actresses from Tokyo
20th-century Japanese actresses
21st-century Japanese actresses
20th-century Japanese women singers
20th-century Japanese singers
21st-century Japanese women singers
21st-century Japanese singers